Paul Hanley and Graydon Oliver were the defending champions, but Oliver did not participate this year.  Hanley partnered Kevin Ullyett, losing in the semifinals.

Bobby Reynolds and Andy Roddick won the title, defeating Paul Goldstein and Jim Thomas 6–4, 6–4 in the final.

Seeds

Draw

Draw

References
Draw

2006 ATP Tour
Doubles